Agelenopsis, commonly known as the American grass spiders, is a genus of funnel weavers first described by C.G. Giebel in 1869. They weave sheet webs that have a funnel shelter on one edge. The web is not sticky, but these spiders make up for that shortcoming by running very rapidly. The larger specimens (depending on species) can grow to about 19 mm in body length. They may be recognized by the arrangement of their eight eyes into three rows. The top row has two eyes, the middle row has four eyes, and the bottom row has two eyes (spaced wider than the ones on the top row). They have two prominent hind spinnerets, somewhat indistinct bands on their legs, and two dark bands running down either side of the cephalothorax.

Name
The genus name is a combination of Agelena (Eurasian grass spiders), a genus of similar spiders, and Greek -opsis "to look like". They are harmless spiders.  Although most spiders use their webs to catch prey, the grass spider's web lacks adhesive ability.  The spiders make up for that with their fast running.

The main distinction between Agelenopsis and the related European genus Agelena consists of the pattern appearing on the cephalothorax; the former possesses two quasiparallel lines from the eyes to the beginning of the abdomen. The latter genus has curved, irregular lines that often meet at the end. Another difference is the length of the front legs row in females, but in males, the similarities are not as in line.

Species
 it contains fourteen species:
Agelenopsis actuosa (Gertsch & Ivie, 1936) – common American grass spider - USA, Canada 
Agelenopsis aleenae (Chamberlin & Ivie, 1935) – USA
Agelenopsis aperta (Gertsch, 1934) – desert grass spider - USA, Mexico
Agelenopsis emertoni (Chamberlin & Ivie, 1935) – USA
Agelenopsis kastoni (Chamberlin & Ivie, 1941) – USA
Agelenopsis longistyla (Banks, 1901) – USA
Agelenopsis naevia (Walckenaer, 1841) – USA, Canada
Agelenopsis oklahoma (Gertsch, 1936) – USA, Canada
Agelenopsis oregonensis (Chamberlin & Ivie, 1935) – USA, Canada
Agelenopsis pennsylvanica (C. L. Koch, 1843) – USA, Canada
Agelenopsis potteri (Blackwall, 1846) – North America. Introduced to Ukraine, Russia (Europe, Far East), Kyrgyzstan
Agelenopsis riechertae (Bosco & Chuang, 2018) – USA
Agelenopsis spatula (Chamberlin & Ivie, 1935) – USA
Agelenopsis utahana (Chamberlin & Ivie, 1933) – USA, Canada

Gallery

See also 
 Funnel-web spider

References

External links
 Agelenidae species
 Pictures of Agelenopsis sp. (free for noncommercial use)
 Diagnostic Photos and information, Agelenopsis sp.
 Common Spiders in California, Agelenopsis sp.

Agelenidae
Spiders of the United States
Araneomorphae genera